The Man Beneath is a 1919 American silent crime drama film directed by William Worthington and produced by Sessue Hayakawa's Haworth Pictures Corporation. An incomplete copy of the film is in the collection of the EYE Film Institute Netherlands.

Plot
As described in a film magazine, Kate Erskine (Eddy) and her sister Mary (Curley) love Dr. Chindi Ashutor (Hayakawa) and James Bassett (Gilbert), respectively, the latter having been college chums, one being a noted physician while the other pursuing no occupation as yet. Mary and Bassett become engaged while Dr. Ashutor goes to aid his countrymen in plague-stricken India. While he is away Bassett receives a summons from the Black Hand, an order he joined in his youth for adventure. Feeling his life in danger, he goes to Dr. Ashutor in India and with his aid almost succeeds in establishing his feigned death as a reality. However, the spies of the order follow them to Scotland and to the home of the Erskines. Here Dr. Ashutor is instrumental in finally ridding Bassett from the menace of the order. Mary and Bassett then marry, while the situation of Kate and Dr. Ashutor remains undecided.

Cast
Sessue Hayakawa as Dr. Chindi Ashutor
Helen Jerome Eddy as Kate Erskine
Pauline Curley as Mary Erskine
John Gilbert as James Bassett (credited as Jack Gilbert)
Fontaine La Rue as Countess Petite Florence
Wedgwood Nowell as François
Fanny Midgley (uncredited)

References

External links 

 
Film still at silentera.com

Haworth Pictures Corporation films
Films directed by William Worthington
1919 crime drama films
American crime drama films
American black-and-white films
American silent feature films
Film Booking Offices of America films
1919 films
1910s American films
Silent American drama films